Montgomery County Courthouse may refer to:

 Montgomery County Courthouse (Arkansas), Mount Ida, Arkansas
 Montgomery County Courthouse (Georgia), Mount Vernon, Georgia
 Montgomery County Courthouse (Iowa), Red Oak, Iowa
 Montgomery County Courthouse (Illinois), Hillsboro, Illinois
 Montgomery County Courthouse (Indiana), in Crawfordsville, Indiana, location of one of Indiana's public art works
 Montgomery County Courthouse (Kansas), Independence, Kansas
 Any of the Montgomery County Circuit Courthouses, Rockville, Maryland:
1891 red brick Romanesque Revival old courthouse
1931 Neo-classical granite old courthouse
1980s Circuit Court for Montgomery County
 Montgomery County Courthouse (North Carolina), Troy, North Carolina
 Montgomery County Courthouse (Ohio), Dayton, Ohio